"My Way" is the third single by American rapper and singer Fetty Wap, featuring Remy Boyz's RGF Productions' member Monty, from Wap's self-titled debut album. It peaked at number seven on the Billboard Hot 100.

The song has over 32 million views on YouTube, while an unofficial upload has amassed 212 million views. In June 2015, Canadian rapper Drake premiered his remix of the song. On July 16, 2015, a remastered version of the original song leaked. This version added new adlibs to the song. The next day, the song was released as a commercial single on iTunes. The final version of the song maintained the new adlibs, but with a slightly altered instrumental.

Commercial performance
"My Way" debuted at number 98 on the Billboard Hot 100 for the chart dated July 18, 2015. Three weeks later, following its release to digital retailers, "My Way" jumped 80 positions from 87 to number 7, fueled by 152,000 first-week sales and 6.6 million domestic streams. The song's jump into the top ten made Wap the third artist to have two concurrent top ten hits in the year 2015—his prior single "Trap Queen" was ranked number six that week—as well as the first male rapper to have two concurrent top ten hits as a lead artist since 2011, when Lil Wayne accomplished the feat.

Music video  
The song's accompanying music video premiered on September 23, 2015 on Fetty Wap's YouTube account. The video features scenes of Wap wearing a Chicago Bulls jersey, celebrating with his crew and Remy Boyz. Wap also appears performing onstage, as well as shots of Monty driving a BMW i8 through the streets, while singing along to the song.

Charts

Weekly charts

Year-end charts

Certifications

References

External links

2015 singles
Fetty Wap songs
Songs written by Fetty Wap
300 Entertainment singles
2015 songs
American contemporary R&B songs
Drake (musician) songs
Songs written by Drake (musician)